Francisco de Araujo (1580 – 19 March 1664) was a Spanish Catholic theologian.

He was born at Verin, Galicia, Spain.  In 1601, he entered the Dominican Order at Salamanca. He taught theology (1616–17) in the convent of St. Paul at Burgos, and in the latter year was made assistant to Peter of Herrera, the principal professor of theology at Salamanca. Six years later he succeeded to the chair, and held it until 1648, when he was appointed Bishop of Segovia. In 1656 he resigned his Episcopal see, and retired to the convent of his order at Madrid, where he died.

Works
 Commentaria in universam Aristotelis metaphysicam, Commentary on the Metaphysics of Aristotle (Two vols: 1° Salamanca, 1617; 2°, ibid., 1631); 
 Opuscula tripartita, h.e. in tres controversias triplicis theologiae divisa etc. (Douay, 1633); 
 A commentary in seven volumes on the Summa of St. Thomas Aquinas (Salamanca and Madrid, 1635–47); 
 Variae et selectae decisiones morales ad stat. eccles. et civil. pertinentes (Lyons, 1664; 2d ed., Cologne, 1745). 
 In the second volume of his commentary on Aquinas' "Prima Secundae" there is a treatise on Predestination and Grace, the doctrine of which is Molinistic. Martinez de Prado has proved that this was not written by Araujo, who, in a later work, shows clearly his adherence to the Thomistic teaching on those questions.

References

Attribution
 Cites:
Quétif-Échard, Script. Ord. Praed., I, 609; 
Martinez de Prado, Metaphysica, I, 518; 
Nicolás Antonio, Bibliotheca Hisp. Nova; 
Meyer, Historia controversiarum de auxiliis gratiae, I, ii, c. xxiii, and II, ii, c. xvii; 
Jacques-Hyacinthe Serry, Historia congregationum de auxiliis, IV, 27; V, iii, ii; 
Hugo von Hurter, Nomenclator, II, 5–7; 
Dummermuth, St. Thomas et doctrina praemotionis physicae (Paris 1886), 582–588; 
Stanonik in Kirchenlexikon (2d ed., 1882), I, 1228–1229.

Further reading
 Beuchot, Mauricio Puente. Metafísica. La ontología aristotélico-tomista de Francisco de Araújo. Ciudad de México: Instituto de Investigaciones Filosóficas UNAM 1987.
 Fernández-Rodríguez, José Luis. El ente de razón en Francisco Araújo. Pamplona: Ediciones Universidad de Navarra 1972.
 Millán-Puelles, Antonio. Teoría del objeto puro, Madrid: Rialp, 1990 (English translation: The Theory of the Pure Object, Heidelberg: Universitätsverlag C. Winter, 1996).
 Novotný, Daniel. Twenty Years after Suárez: Francisco de Araújo on the Nature, Existence, & Causes of Entia Rationis in Hircocervi & Other Metaphysical Wonders. Essays in Honor of John P. Doyle, edited by Victor M. Salas, Milwaukee: Marquette University Press, 2013, 241–268.
 Wells, Norman J. Francisco Araujo, O.P., on Eternal Truths, in Graceful Reason: Essays in Ancient and Medieval Philosophy Presented to Joseph Owens, edited by Lloyd P. Gerson, Toronto: Pontifical Institute of Mediaeval Studies, 1983, 401–417.

1580 births
1664 deaths
17th-century Spanish Roman Catholic theologians
Spanish Dominicans
University of Salamanca alumni
Academic staff of the University of Salamanca